Oncerus is a genus of May beetles and junebugs in the family Scarabaeidae. There is one described species in Oncerus, O. floralis.

References

Further reading

 
 
 
 
 

Melolonthinae
Articles created by Qbugbot